The A 33 road is an A-Grade trunk road in Sri Lanka. It connects Ja Ela with Yakkala.

The A 33
 passes through Gampaha to reach Yakkala.

References

Highways in Sri Lanka